Alberta Provincial Highway No. 201, officially named Stoney Trail and Tsuut'ina Trail, is an approximately  freeway in Calgary, Alberta. It forms part of the CANAMEX Corridor which connects Calgary to Edmonton and Interstate 15 in the United States via Highways 2, 3, and 4. The freeway serves as a bypass for the congested routes of 16 Avenue N and Deerfoot Trail through Calgary (Highways 1 and 2, respectively). At its busiest point near Beddington Trail in north Calgary, the six-lane freeway carried nearly 79,000 vehicles per day in 2019.

Stoney Trail begins in the city's northwest at Highway 1 near Canada Olympic Park, running north across the Bow River and Crowchild Trail.  It winds through the hills of northwest Calgary to Deerfoot Trail and the Queen Elizabeth II Highway. Turning south, the freeway again intersects Highway 1, crosses Glenmore Trail, and curves west at the neighbourhood of Mahogany.  Beyond a second major interchange with Deerfoot Trail, it descends across the Bow River to Macleod Trail in the city's southeast, running west near the city's southern limit before turning north and becoming Tsuut'ina Trail as it crosses Fish Creek into the Tsuutʼina Nation. North of the Elbow River, the name reverts to Stoney Trail as the highway bends west to end near the city's west limit where it becomes Highway 8.

The freeway's "Stoney" name is derived from the Nakoda First Nation, one of several major thoroughfares in the region that bear Indigenous names. Construction first began in northwest Calgary as an expressway in the 1990s, incrementally extending clockwise towards Deerfoot Trail before two public–private partnership (P3) projects completed the northeast and southeast sections in 2009 and 2013, respectively.  After years of struggling to acquire right of way for the southwest portion of the road from the adjacent Tsuutʼina Nation, Alberta finally struck a  deal in 2013 with the Nation that included a transfer of Crown land and other reparative conditions. The latest section of the road completed in 2021 extended Stoney Trail south from Fish Creek Boulevard to Highway 22X. The final leg in west Calgary, connecting Highway 1 and Highway 8, is planned for completion by 2024.

Route description 
Stoney Trail currently consists of the northwest, northeast, southeast, and southwest sections of the ring road, and, at its completion, will effectively be a freeway that encircles the entire city. The northern and southern sections create a northern and eastern bypass link between Highway 1 (Trans-Canada Highway) and Deerfoot Trail (Highway 2).

History 
Planning for the Calgary and Edmonton ring roads began in the 1970s when Alberta developed some restricted development areas in a corridor of land then mostly outside the developed civic areas for future infrastructure, including high-speed ring-road systems.  This land is also known as the Transportation and Utility Corridor (TUC), as land set aside for future road and utility purposes.  Land acquisition started in 1974, and by the time the ring road projects were initiated, Alberta had acquired 97% of the lands.  The Calgary TUC failed to include a corridor in southwest Calgary between Glenmore Trail and Highway 22X.  The City of Calgary is bounded along 37 Street SW by the Tsuut'ina Nation.  The developed areas of Calgary had already reached 37 Street SW around the Glenmore Reservoir inhibiting the ability of the government to impose an RDA.  The missing link in the TUC map created uncertainty in the future positioning of the southwest leg of the freeway.  In 2013, a land acquisition agreement was signed by Alberta with the Tsuut'ina Nation, and construction began in 2016.

Northwest leg 

The northwest quadrant of the ring road was the first to be constructed.  In the mid-1990s, the province of Alberta built the first segment around the Bow River Bridge connecting Highway 1 with Crowchild Trail. This was subsequently extended to Country Hills Boulevard. In 2003, the province announced plans for a  extension east to Deerfoot Trail.  The original design was limited in scope and incorporated two interchanges, one flyover and two signalized intersections with completion scheduled in 2007 at a cost of $250  million.  In January 2005, the province announced an increase in scope of the project with the addition of three additional interchanges at Crowchild Trail, Country Hills Boulevard and Scenic Acres Link.
In addition to increasing costs, the project was delayed and the full extension to Deerfoot Trail was not opened until November 2, 2009, although some sections were opened earlier.
The portion of the ring road between Harvest Hills Boulevard and Deerfoot Trail opened to traffic on November 2, 2009. 30,000 to 40,000 vehicles were expected to use this segment daily.  Actual peak traffic volumes exceeded 40,000 vpd between Crowchild Trail and Country Hills Boulevard in 2010.

Grading has been completed for a future interchange at 11 Street NE.  This road would service undeveloped industrial land bounded to the east by Deerfoot Trail, north by Stoney Trail, west by the CPR right-of-way and south by Country Hills Boulevard.  No schedule has been set for the construction of this interchange.  The interchange will also provide a road connection north of Stoney Trail.

The northwest ring road opened on November 2, 2009, with traffic signals at Harvest Hills Boulevard but grading was completed for a future possible interchange. On November 25, 2009, the province announced construction of the Harvest Hills Boulevard Interchange to be opening in fall 2010.  The cost of the interchange project was $14 million. The interchange opened to traffic in 2010. Grading was completed for a future interchange at 14 Street NW. For many years there was a right-in-right-out access south of Stoney Trail into the Panorama Hills neighbourhood. Planning for the construction of a right-in-right-out access north of Stoney Trail was announced in 2014 and completed the following year. In summer 2014, grading began for westbound exit to 14th (northbound only) and southbound 14th entrance ramp to westbound Stoney. The city announced plans to fund this interchange in 2014. Construction of the interchange began in 2019 and was completed in September 2021.

A signalized intersection was initially constructed at Beddington Trail and Symons Valley Road, but it was upgraded to an interchange when the project was finished in 2009.  This interchange opened in July 2009, when the segment from Sarcee Trail to Harvest Hills Boulevard was opened a few months ahead of the full extension to Deerfoot Trail. Originally, Alberta Transportation intended only to construct a flyover at Shaganappi Trail, with no connections to the northwest ring road when the project was initiated but was upgraded to an interchange when the project was finished in 2009. This interchange opened in July 2009 when the segment from Sarcee Trail to Harvest Hills Boulevard was opened a few months ahead of the full extension to Deerfoot Trail.

At Sarcee Trail a signalized intersection was initially constructed, but upgraded to an interchange when the project was completed. The segment from Country Hills Boulevard to Sarcee Trail was opened on November 25, 2008, a year ahead of the full extension to Deerfoot Trail. An interchange at Country Hills Boulevard was added to the northwest ring road project in January 2005 to replace the original signalized intersection built when this segment of the ring road was built in the 1990s.  The original project scope had this remaining as a signalized intersection. The interchange opened to traffic in September 2008.

A new interchange was announced on January 28, 2005, for Crowchild Trail as part of an upgrade to the $250 million project. Plans to extend the CTrain resulted in changes to the design of the interchange. The Crowchild Interchange was constructed along a pre-existing portion of Stoney Trail, and the design was modified to be free-flowing and to include an LRT bridge to allow for the CTrain to be extended west to Tuscany station.  The Crowchild interchange fully opened to traffic on September 28, 2011.

In January 2005, an interchange at Tuscany Boulveard/Scenic Acres Link was added.  The full interchange opened to traffic in the fall of 2009. Following the completion of the Crowchild Trail interchange, the only remaining traffic signals were at the intersection with Nose Hill Drive.  Aecom was retained in the spring of 2010 to plan, design and administer construction of this interchange to be open in the fall of 2012. Design and public information delays caused Alberta Transportation to revise its expectations and it was announced that construction of the interchange would commence in early 2011 and be completed in the fall of 2013.  However, the tender process was slow to be initiated and it was not until November 17, 2011 that Alberta Transportation announced the Nose Hill Drive interchange would be built by Acciona Infrastructure Canada at a cost of $67 million and be opened to traffic in the fall of 2014.

Northeast leg 

In December 2005, Calgary had announced it was in talks with the province to expedite construction, and on February 22, 2007 Alberta's Ministry of Infrastructure and Transportation awarded a contract to the Stoney Trail Group public-private partnership consortium (P3) for construction of the project's first stage, and maintenance of the northwest and northeast sections of the ring road for 30 years following completion.

Major interchanges along the northeast route include Métis Trail (which serves as an alternate link to the CrossIron Mills shopping area north of the city, Country Hills Boulevard, McKnight Boulevard, and 16 Avenue NE (Highway 1).  A partial cloverleaf interchange was built at Métis Trail, a north–south expressway.  The City of Calgary opened the extension of Métis Trail between 80 and 96 Avenues NE on October 29, 2011. Right-in/right-out ramps to 60 Street NE from eastbound Stoney Trail were completed on November 22, 2019. Grading has been completed for a future interchange at 60 Street NE that will be completed when required, and may also be future right of way for a CTrain extension. On October 12, 2011, 96 Avenue was opened from Stoney Trail west to 60 Street NE, accessible only from the south. The diamond interchange at McKnight Boulevard will be upgraded into a partial cloverleaf interchange when required. The project included a large cloverstack interchange at 16 Avenue NE.

Southeast leg 
On March 2, 2009, the Alberta Government announced construction would be proceeding on the remaining portion of the East Freeway from 17 Avenue SE to Highway 22X, as well as improvements to the existing Highway 22X roadway between that location and just east of the Macleod Trail (Highway 2A) interchange. This portion, like the northeastern portion, was built as a P3.  Three firms bid on the contract: Chinook Partnership, SEConnect and SE Calgary Connector Group.  The winning bid of $769 million was submitted by Chinook Roads Partnership.  Chinook Roads Partnership will also be responsible for maintenance of this portion of the Ring Road, as well as maintenance of Deerfoot Trail between Highway 22X and Highway 2A for 30 years after construction completion.

Construction on the southeast leg began in the spring of 2010, and was opened on November 22, 2013, almost two months behind schedule. The southeast extension of Stoney Trail also resulted in upgrades to Highway 22X between Stoney and Macleod Trails.  When the extension opened in 2013, the City officially renamed this portion of 22X as part of Stoney Trail, and the province designated it as part of Highway 201.  Highway 22X continues west of Macleod Trail as Spruce Meadows Trail, while 22X continues east of Stoney Trail toward Gleichen.

An interchange was constructed at Sun Valley Boulevard / Chaparral Boulevard, upgraded from the existing intersection.  The original project schedule from June 2010 had interchange construction starting in 2010 with construction of the bridge structure in 2011 towards a phased opening in 2012–2013.

The McKenzie Lake Boulevard / Cranston Boulevard intersection was upgraded to a modified diamond interchange; work on this interchange began 2010 and by fall 2011 the bridge structure had been erected. The interchange design is a modified diamond and integrates into the nearby cloverstack interchange at Deerfoot Trail.

A partial cloverleaf interchange was constructed at 52 Street SE.  The original project schedule from June 2010 had this interchange fully opening in the fall of 2013 with traffic on the new structure in the summer of 2012 with construction starting in 2011.  The revised project schedule of June 2011 still indicated a fall 2013 opening, the only significant difference is the temporary constructions detour road has been shifted to the east side of the bridge structure from the west side.  As of December 2011, construction of the interchange had started with grading of the interchange ramps and piling installation. 52 Street interchange was completed with the rest of the project on November 22, 2013. At 88 Street SE, Stoney Trail intersects with 22X with a hybrid interchange.  An existing intersection at 88 Street SE was removed.  Grading was also completed for a future interchange at 130 Avenue. A similar partial cloverleaf interchange was constructed at a slightly realigned 114 Avenue SE. The interchange fully opened on November 22, 2013.

Partial cloverleaf interchanges were constructed at Glenmore and Peigan Trails.  Peigan Trail was also be extended from 52 Street to Stoney Trail as a result. The existing 17 Avenue SE intersection, which had been the terminus of the freeway since 2009, was upgraded to a partial cloverleaf interchange.

Southwest leg 

On October 1st, 2020, the northern section of the southwest leg of stoney trail opened. This extended the total length by 9 km, from Glenmore Trail to Fish Creek Blvd. This section was built on the Tsuut'ina Nation, and was brought with many delays. Construction began in 2016, and the segment that goes through the nation is designated as the Tsuut'ina Trail. The final 4 km connecting fish creek Boulevard to Highway 22X opened 1 year later, on October 2, 2021. The southwest leg extended Stoney Trail from Macleod Trail to Highway 8, continuing west towards the next section to be constructed.

Lane count

Future 
Construction is underway on the final leg of the freeway in west Calgary; the project has been divided into north and south projects. In 2019, construction began on the northern portion of the west leg of Stoney Trail, extending the freeway from its present terminus at Highway 1 south to Old Banff Coach Road. Work on this portion of the freeway was originally projected to be completed in 2022 and includes reconstruction of the existing 16 Avenue interchange, construction of a new bridge over the Bow River and upgrades to 16 Avenue adjacent to Valley Ridge. The road will climb along the west side of Canada Olympic Park adjacent to Cougar Ridge ending at new interchange with Old Banff Coach Road. The southern portion of the west leg will extend the freeway further south to interchanges at Bow Trail (12 Avenue SW) and 17 Avenue SW, ending at Highway 8 which will complete the ring. The southern portion of the west leg has been delayed to a "worst case" completion date of 2024 from the originally planned 2022, due to litigation regarding the relocation of power lines, and supply issues related to the COVID-19 pandemic. Alberta hopes to have the road completed prior to then, and may open sections sooner than that if they are able. 

On the northwest section the city of Calgary has begun the Stoney Trail North Interchange Projects to address growing traffic from major developments to the north of the city. The projects involves upgrades to the Shagganappi and Harvest Hills Boulevard interchanges by building new overpasses to the west of the existing structures, increasing the number of lanes crossing Stoney Trail from three to six in both cases. The North Stoney project also includes a new partial cloverleaf interchange at 14th Street NW with roundabouts and a new trumpet interchange at 11 Street NE, which provides access to the community of Keystone Hills to the north. The 14th Street interchange opened in mid 2021. Construction at Shagganapi, Harvest Hills and 11th Street started in summer 2021 and will be finished by fall 2022.

In late 2020 the Government of Alberta announced a plan to replace the existing eastbound bridge over the Bow River on Southeast Stoney Trail, widen the westbound bridge and build a new, stand-alone pedestrian bridge. The project will increase the number of lanes to four in each direction — currently the eastbound crossing has two lanes, while the westbound has three. In January 2021 PCL Construction won a $48-million contract to upgrade the Stoney Trail bridges. The Alberta government first estimated the project would cost $70 million in total, but later said the total estimated cost which includes engineering and utility relocations has decreased to $60 million. Construction on the project started in April 2021 and is expected to be completed in fall 2023.

Exit list 
Going clockwise:

See also 
Transportation in Calgary
Anthony Henday Drive
Deerfoot Trail
Trans-Canada Highway

Notes

References

External links 

West Calgary Ring Road
Southwest Calgary Ring Road
South Calgary Ring Road

Freeways in Alberta
Proposed roads in Canada
Ring roads in Canada
Roads in Calgary